

V1500 Cygni or Nova Cygni 1975 was a bright nova occurring in 1975 in the constellation Cygnus.  It had the second highest intrinsic brightness of any nova of the 20th century, exceeded only by CP Puppis in 1942.

V1500 Cygni was discovered shining at an apparent brightness of magnitude 3.0 by Minoru Honda of Kurashiki, Japan on 29 August 1975. It had brightened to magnitude 1.7 on the next day, and then rapidly faded. It remained visible to the naked eye for about a week, and 680 days after reaching maximum the star had dimmed by 12.5 magnitudes.

It is an AM Herculis type star, consisting of a red dwarf secondary depositing a stream of material onto a highly magnetized white dwarf primary.  The distance of the V1500 Cygni was calculated in 1977 by the McDonald Observatory at 1.95 kiloparsecs (6,360 light years). More recently the Gaia space observatory determined a distance of approximately 5,100 light years. Additionally, V1500 Cyg was the first asynchronous polar to be discovered. This distinction refers to the fact that the white dwarf's spin period is slightly different from the binary orbital period.

See also
Nova Cygni 1920
Nova Cygni 1992

References

Further reading

External links 
 
 
 

Novae
Cygnus (constellation)
1975 in science
Cygni, V1500
Polars (cataclysmic variable stars)